Kouakou Privat Yao N’goran (born 30 June 1991) is an Ivorian footballer who plays as a forward.

Club career

Spartak Trnava
Yao made his professional Fortuna Liga debut for Spartak Trnava against Ružomberok on 31 July 2016.

Currently, Yao is a member of FK Palanga in Lithuanian top A Lyga.

References

External links
 FC Spartak Trnava official club profile
 Fortuna Liga profile
 
 Eurofotbal profile
 Futbalnet profile

1991 births
Living people
Ivorian footballers
Association football forwards
ŠK Blava Jaslovské Bohunice players
FC Spartak Trnava players
FC ViOn Zlaté Moravce players
Slovak Super Liga players
4. Liga (Slovakia) players
Ivorian expatriate footballers
Expatriate footballers in Spain
Expatriate footballers in Slovakia
Expatriate footballers in Lithuania
Ivorian expatriate sportspeople in Spain
Ivorian expatriate sportspeople in Slovakia
Ivorian expatriate sportspeople in Lithuania
People from Bouaké